Third World is a cancelled role-playing video game from Redline Games and Activision.

Development
The game was in development at Redline Games, a company founded by programmer James Anhalt, designer Ron Millar, and other former members of Blizzard Entertainment. Millar was the game's lead designer.

Activision announced the game in April 1998 and showcased it at E3 1998. The game was originally scheduled to release in late 1998. The release date was pushed to 1999. Activision dropped to the game in April 1999 for unknown reasons. The game was later cancelled in January 2000 due to a lack of funding.

References

Activision games
Cancelled Windows games
Post-apocalyptic video games
Role-playing video games
Science fiction video games